Milada is a genus of bristle flies in the family Tachinidae. There is at least one described species in Milada, M. asiatica.

Distribution
Kazakhstan, Mongolia, Russia.

References

Dexiinae
Diptera of Asia
Monotypic Brachycera genera
Tachinidae genera